This is a list of some of the cattle breeds considered in Austria to be wholly or partly of Austrian origin. Some may have complex or obscure histories, so inclusion here does not necessarily imply that a breed is predominantly or exclusively Austrian.

Extant breeds 

 Ennstaler Bergscheck
 Kärntner Blondvieh
 Murbodner
 Original Braunvieh
 Österreichisches Braunvieh
 Österreichisches Gelbvieh
 Pinzgauer
 Pustertaler Sprinzen
 Tiroler Grauvieh
 Tux-Zillertaler
 Waldviertler Blondvieh

Extinct breeds 
 Jochberger Hummeln
 Lechtaler
 Mölltaler
 Mürztal
 Oststeirisches Fleckvieh
 Steirisches Braunvieh
 Tiroler Braunvieh
 Wipptaler
 Zillertaler

References

 
Cattle